Tuntutuliak Airport  is a state-owned public-use airport located one nautical mile (1.85 km) south of the central business district of Tuntutuliak, in the Bethel Census Area of the U.S. state of Alaska.

Facilities and aircraft 
Tuntutuliak Airport has one runway designated 2/20 with a gravel surface measuring 3,025 by 23 feet (922 x 7 m). For the 12-month period ending August 26, 2008, the airport had 390 aircraft operations, an average of 32 per month: 87% air taxi and 13% general aviation.

Airlines and destinations

References

External links 
 FAA Alaska airport diagram (GIF)

Airports in the Bethel Census Area, Alaska